Quadrana is a genus of planthoppers belonging to the family Achilidae.

Species
Species:
 Quadrana punctata Caldwell, 1951

References

Achilidae